China TV Drama Flying Apsaras Awards, also known as Flying Apsaras Awards or simply Feitian Awards, is a biennial awards ceremony awarding excellent achievement in Chinese television. Named after the Gandhanra aka Flying Apsaras, the award stature shape is sourced from the ancient painting of Flying Apsaras in Mogao Caves, Dunhuang. It is the longest running television award ceremony in China.

The ceremony is the highest government honor in the television industry. Feitian Awards, along with the Golden Eagle Awards, Gold Panda Awards and Magnolia Awards are the most prestigious awards given.

History
The Feitian Awards were first held in 1981, and presented by the Ministry of Culture of the People's Republic of China, however it was soon taken over by the government ministries SARFT and the Motion Picture and Arts Committee of China (中国电视艺术委员会). In 1983, the awards were renamed "Feitian", literally "Flying Apsaras". The awards ceremony was originally held to honour television series only, however, four acting categories including Actor, Actress, Supporting Actor and Supporting Actress were created in 1984. The director, writer, cinematography and music were created in 1993.

The Outstanding television awards have undergone several category reforms. It initially separated the winning productions by length (serial drama, mid-length, miniseries), with each category awarding dramas based on first-class (一等奖), second-class (二等奖) and third-class (三等奖) honours. From 2015 onwards, the dramas have been awarded based on the genres historical, modern and significant events only.

Formerly an annual event, the Feitian and Golden Eagle Awards have taken place on alternate years since 2005, with the Feitian taking place on odd years.

Awards Categories

Current Categories
Outstanding Historical Television Series 优秀历史题材类电视剧
Outstanding Modern Television Series 优秀现实题材类电视剧
Outstanding Television Series Based on Significant Events 优秀重大题材类电视剧
Outstanding Director 优秀导演
Outstanding Writer 优秀编剧
Outstanding Actor 优秀男演员
Outstanding Actress 优秀女演员

Defunct Categories
Outstanding Music 优秀音乐
Outstanding Sound Editing 优秀音像
Outstanding Editing 优秀剪辑
Outstanding Artistry 优秀艺术
Outstanding Cinematography 优秀摄像

See also

 List of Asian television awards

References

External links
Feitian Television Awards at the Internet Movie Database
CFLAC.ORG.CN

 
Chinese television awards
Awards established in 1981
1981 establishments in China
Recurring events established in 1981
Annual events in China
Biennial events